Platte Kill flows into the East Branch Delaware River by Dunraven, New York.

References

Rivers of New York (state)
Rivers of Delaware County, New York
Tributaries of the East Branch Delaware River